Mike Werner (born 13 February 1971) is a German former professional footballer who played as a defender.

Career
Werner began playing football for BSG Energie Cottbus. He was then allowed to join the youth department of army-sponsored football club FC Vorwärts Frankfurt in 1984. Werner joined the reserve team FC Vorwärts Frankfurt II in the second-tier DDR-Liga in 1988. He then made his debut for the first team of FC Vorwärts Frankfurt in the DDR-Oberliga as a 17-year-old away against 1. FC Magdeburg on the 20th matchday of the 1987–88 DDR-Oberliga 6 April 1988.

Werner claims that the army-officers at FC Vorwärts Frankfurt eventually had enough of him after a teacher had found a scribbling he had made, with notes such as "Udo Lindenberg" and "The wall must go". He was subsequently demoted to second-grade enterprise sports community BSG Motor Eberswalde in 1989.

Werner was invited to Hansa Rostock during the winter break 1990–1991. Then Hansa Rostock coach Uwe Reinders wanted to see him for a trial session. Werner then joined the team of Hansa Rostock for the second half of the 1990–91 season. Werner ultimately won the 1990–91 NOFV-Oberliga and the 1990–91 NOFV-Pokal with Hansa Rostock.

Hansa Rostock joined the Bundesliga after German re-unification. Werner played for Hansa Rostock in the Bundesliga. He was part of a team that won victories against opponents such as Bayern Munich and Borussia Dortmund. Werner was not used as a central defender at Hansa Rostock, but as a marker. He has explained that his job at the pitch was not to ”shape football”, but "solely to destroy the opponent's game", by "following the opposing striker everywhere". Werner neither spared himself, nor the opponent.

Hansa Rostock was relegated to the 2. Bundesliga after 1991–92 season. Werner won promotion back to the Bundesliga with Hansa Rostock in the 1994–95 season. Hansa Rostock then managed a sixth place in the 1995–96 Bundesliga. However, Werner suffered a cruciate ligament tear and had to undergo several operations. He subsequently ended his professional career in 1996.

Werner later continued in amateur football. He  first played for TSV Graal-Müritz, before joining TSV Neustrelitz in the sixth tier Verbandsliga Mecklenburg-Vorpommern in 2001. TSG Neustrelitz was promoted to NOFV-Oberliga Nord in 2002. Werner played 19 matches for TSG Neustrelitz in the 2002–03 NOFV-Oberliga Nord. He left TSG Neustreliz for PSV Ribnitz-Damgarten in 2003. Werner played for PSV Ribnitz-Damgarten until retiring in May 2005. He then took over as coach of PSV Ribnitz-Damgarten in the Bezirksklasse. The team of PSV Ribnitz-Damgarten eventually won promotion to the Landesliga Mecklenburg-Vorpommern under Werner.

Werner returned to Hansa Rostock in June 2010 as an assistant to C-Junior coach Juri Schlünz. He then joined TSV Graal-Müritz as a coach in the Landesliga Mecklenburg-Vorpommern during the winter of 2013. He then served B-Junior coach at TSV Graal-Müritz. Werner joined FC Pommern Stralsund as assistant coach in July 2017. He has since also served as interim coach of PSV Ribnitz-Damgarten in the Landesklasse Mecklenburg-Vorpommern in 2020.

Miscellaneous
Werner was known for his eye-catching haircut with mullet and moustache. He had been forced to keep his hair short at army club FC Vorwärts Frankfurt, and used the transfer to BSG Motor Eberswalde as an opportunity to finally grow his hair. When arriving at Hansa Rostock, he already had a "mighty mullet", in his own words. Uwe Reinders allegedly once said: "If you don't cut your hair, you don't play", but Werner did not care. 

Werner immediately caused controversy at Hansa Rostock. Between two matches during an indoor tournament in Bremen, shortly after starting at Hansa Rostock, he accepted a vodka from a visitor. The visitor turned out to be a journalist from tabloid Bild. The next day, Bild wrote, "Hansa players drink vodka at the indoor tournament!" in big letters.

Honours
Hansa Rostock
 East German Champion: 1990–91 
 NOFV-Pokal: 1990–91 
 2. Bundesliga: 1994–95

References

External links
 

1971 births
Living people
People from Spremberg
East German footballers
German footballers
Footballers from Brandenburg
Association football defenders
DDR-Oberliga players
Bundesliga players
2. Bundesliga players
1. FC Frankfurt players
FV Preussen Eberswalde players
FC Hansa Rostock players
TSG Neustrelitz players